Utah State Route 16 may refer to:

 Utah State Route 16, a state highway in Rich County in northern Utah, United States
 Utah State Route 16 (1962-1977), a former state highway in Rich County, Utah, United States
 Utah State Route 16 (1935-1955), a former state highway in northwestern Washington County and southwestern Iron County in southwestern Utah, United States
 Utah State Route 16 (1920s–1935), a former state highway in southeastern Washington County, Utah, United States

See also
 List of state highways in Utah
 List of highways numbered 16